Kottmann may refer to:

 Alois Kottmann (born 1929), German violinist and university professor
 Angelika Schaffar-Kottmann (born 1967), German violinist
 Boris Kottmann (born 1964), German violinist
 Gottfried Kottmann (1932–1964), Swiss rower
  (born 1937), German soccer coach
 Marco Kottmann (born 1980), Swiss football midfielder
 maia arson crimew (formerly, Tillie Kottmann, born 1999), Swiss computer hacker

See also 
 Alois Kottmann Award for classical canto-style play of the violin

German-language surnames